2011 EU census, or EU population and housing census 2011 was an EU-wide census in 2011 in all EU member states.

2011 EU member state censuses

References

European Union
EU
Census